The 64th Evening Standard Theatre Awards were awarded in recognition of the 2017–18 London Theatre season on 18 November 2018 at the Theatre Royal, Drury Lane. Nominations were announced in November 2018. The ceremony was presented by Phoebe Waller-Bridge and co-hosted by Idris Elba, Claire Foy, Evgeny Lebedev and Anna Wintour.

Eligibility and nominators 
All new productions and performances on the London stage between 20 October 2017 and 16 October 2018 were eligible for consideration.

The Advisory Judging Panel consisted of Evening Standard chief theatre critic Henry Hitchings, Daily Mail columnist Baz Bamigboye, The Guardian culture writer and broadcaster Mark Lawson, WhatsOnStage theatre critic Sarah Crompton, The New York Times International theatre critic Matt Wolf and Evening Standard editor George Osborne.

Ceremony

Presenters 

 Claire Foy presented Best Actor
 Richard Madden presented the Natasha Richardson Award for Best Actress
 Idris Elba presented Best Musical
 Bea Carrozzini, Charles Wintour’s granddaughter, presented the Most Promising Playwright Award named in his honour
 Stella McCartney presented Best Design
 Patti LuPone presented the Lebedev Award
 John Galliano provided a tribute to theatre dressers

Performances 

 Jonathan Bailey, Alex Gaumond and Daisy Maywood performed "Getting Married Today" from Company

 Michael Jibson performed "You’ll Be Back" from Hamilton
 Sharon D. Clarke performed "Lot’s Wife" from Caroline, or Change

Sponsors 
The 'Official Platinum Partner' was Michael Kors, and the following awards were presented in partnership:

 Best Play was awarded in partnership with Chanel
 Best Actor was awarded in partnership with the Ambassador Theatre Group
 The Natasha Richardson Award for Best Actress was awarded in partnership with Christian Louboutin
 Emerging Talent was awarded in partnership with Access Entertainment
 The tribute to theatre dressers was presented in partnership with Maison Margiela

Audi, Laurent-Perrier, Monica Vinader and Tommy Hilfiger were also event partners.

Non-competitive awards 
The Lebedev Award went to Cameron Mackintosh in recognition for his contribution to musical theatre.

Winners and nominees

Multiple awards 
2 awards

 Antony and Cleopatra
 Company
 Hamilton

Multiple nominations 
4 nominations

 Company

3 nominations

 The Inheritance
 Nine Night
 Translations

2 nominations

 Antony and Cleopatra
 Br’er Cotton
 Caroline, or Change
 Girls and Boys
 Hamilton
 Network
 The Prime of Miss Jean Brodie
 Tina

See also 

 2017 Laurence Olivier Awards
 2018 Laurence Olivier Awards

References 

Evening Standard Theatre Awards ceremonies
2018 theatre awards
2018 awards in the United Kingdom
November 2018 events in the United Kingdom